Les Crozets is a commune in the Jura department in Bourgogne-Franche-Comté in eastern France.

Population

Sites and monuments
Church of St. Anthony;
Fountains (10);
Old toy factory, today a plastics factory
Mount Pelan viewpoint

See also
Communes of the Jura department

References

Communes of Jura (department)
Jura communes articles needing translation from French Wikipedia